Jagdish Singh Kapoor (born 12 September 1947) is an Indian-born Ugandan field hockey player. He competed in the men's tournament at the 1972 Summer Olympics. He is the brother of Ugandan hockey international player Upkar Singh Kapoor.

References

External links
 

1947 births
Living people
People from Patiala
Indian emigrants to Uganda
Ugandan people of Indian descent
Ugandan people of Punjabi descent
Ugandan male field hockey players
Olympic field hockey players of Uganda
Field hockey players at the 1972 Summer Olympics